Culleenabohoge is a townland in County Westmeath, Ireland.

Culleenabohoge is one of 15 townlands of the civil parish of Leny in the barony of Corkaree in the Province of Leinster. The neighbouring townlands are: Ballindurrow and Multyfarnham or Fearbranagh to the north, Tyfarnham to the east, Ballynafid and Knightswood to the south and Culleendarragh to the west.

In the 1911 census of Ireland there were 4 houses and 22 inhabitants in the townland.

References

External links
Culleenabohoge at the IreAtlas Townland Data Base
Culleenabohoge at Townlands.ie
Culleenabohoge at Logainm.ie

Townlands of County Westmeath